Fiction writer Joan Williams (1928-2004) was raised in Memphis, Tennessee. After schooling at the Miss Hutchinson School for Girls, she attended Bard College. During her time at Bard, Williams met and began a professional and personal relationship with novelist William Faulkner, a relationship that has overshadowed her own successful career as a novelist.

Writing career
Williams published her first stories while a student at Bard College. "Rain Later" received the College Fiction Prize from Mademoiselle , and four years later, she published a sequel in the same venue. These two stories together formed the nucleus of her first novel, "The Morning and the Evening," whose publication led novelist William Styron to call Williams a "greatly gifted writer."

Personal life
Williams and Faulkner's relationship was both personal and professional, but Williams never found the personal part of it satisfying: correspondence between the two writers shows Faulkner's ongoing frustration with Williams' ambivalence. In 1954, she married sportswriter and editor Ezra Bowen, whose mother was biographer Catherine Drinker Bowen. Williams and Bowen had two sons and three grand-daughters. From 1984 to 1994, she lived with Atlantic editor Seymour Lawrence, who had accepted a story of hers in 1952. She passed in Atlanta Georgia, surrounded by family, Easter morning.

Works

Novels 
The Morning and the Evening (New York: Atheneum, 1961)

Old Powder Man (New York: Harcourt, Brace & World, 1966)

The Wintering (New York: Harcourt Brace Jovanovich,1971)

Country Woman (Boston: Little, Brown, 1982)

Pay the Piper (New York: E.P. Dutton, 1988)

Short Stories 
"Rain Later," in Mademoiselle

"The Morning and the Evening," in Atlantic Monthly (1952)

Pariah and Other Stories (Boston: Little, Brown, 1983)

Non-fiction 
"Twenty Will not Come Again," in Atlantic Monthly 245.5 (May 1980)

"Sanctuary of the Storyteller: A New Orleans Couple Has Restored the House Where William Faulkner Became a Writer," in Southern Accents 15.3 (April, 1992)

Awards 
Mademoiselle College Fiction Prize, 1949

Best American Short Stories 1949 (honorable mention for "Rain Later")

National Book Award for Fiction finalist, 1961

John P. Marquand First Novel Award, 1961

National Institute of Arts and Letters grant, 1962

Guggenheim Fellowship, 1988

Archives 
Joan Williams's papers reside at the Albert and Shirley Small Special Collections Library at the University of Virginia

References

1928 births
2004 deaths
Novelists from Tennessee
Writers from Memphis, Tennessee
Bard College alumni